In This Our Life is a 1942 American drama film, the second to be directed by John Huston.   The screenplay by Howard Koch is based on the 1941 Pulitzer Prize-winning novel of the same title by Ellen Glasgow. The cast included the established stars Bette Davis and Olivia de Havilland as sisters and rivals in romance and life. Raoul Walsh also worked as director, taking over when Huston was called away for a war assignment after the United States entered World War II, but he was uncredited. This film was the third of six films that de Havilland and Davis starred in together.

Completed in 1942, the film was disapproved in 1943 for foreign release by the wartime Office of Censorship, because it dealt truthfully with racial discrimination as part of its plot.

Plot
In Richmond, Virginia, Asa (Frank Craven) and Lavinia (Billie Burke) (née Fitzroy) Timberlake gave their two daughters male names: Roy (Olivia de Havilland) and Stanley (Bette Davis). The movie opens with the young women as adults. Asa Timberlake has recently lost his piece of a tobacco company to his former partner William Fitzroy (Charles Coburn), his wife's brother. Roy, a successful interior decorator, is married to Dr. Peter Kingsmill (Dennis Morgan). Stanley is engaged to progressive attorney Craig Fleming (George Brent). The night before her wedding, Stanley runs off with Roy's husband Peter. Craig becomes and stays depressed, but Roy soon decides to keep a positive attitude. After Roy divorces Peter, he and Stanley marry and move to Baltimore.

Roy encounters Craig again after some time, and she encourages him to move on with his life. They soon begin dating. Roy refers a young black man, Parry Clay (Ernest Anderson), to Craig, and he hires him to work in his law office while he attends law school. Parry is the son of Minerva Clay (Hattie McDaniel), the Timberlake parents' family maid.

William Fitzroy, Lavinia's brother and Asa's former partner in a tobacco business, doted on his niece Stanley and gave her expensive presents and money, but was very upset when she ran off. He says he will throw Craig some of his legal business if he agrees to stop representing poor clients. When Craig refuses, Roy Timberlake is impressed and decides to accept him in marriage.

In Baltimore, Stanley and Peter's marriage suffers from his heavy drinking and her excessive spending. Peter takes his own life. Shaken, Stanley returns to her home town with Roy. After she recovers, Stanley decides to win back Craig. While discussing her late husband's life insurance with Craig at his office, Stanley invites him to join her later for dinner. When he fails to come to the restaurant, she gets drunk. While driving home, she hits a young mother and her young daughter. Severely injuring the woman and killing the child, in a panic, Stanley drives away.

The police find Stanley's car abandoned with front-end damage and go to question her. Stanley insists she had loaned her car to Parry Clay the night of the accident. On the strength of this accusation alone, Parry Clay is taken into custody. However, Roy suspects that Stanley is hiding the truth, and asks Minerva Clay what she knows. Minerva, despondent about her son being unjustly accused, tells Roy that Parry was home with her all evening, studying. Stanley continues to dissimulate and refuses to admit her responsibility, even when Roy arranges for her to see Parry at the jail where she tries to get him to confirm her story that Parry drove the fateful car and promises him she'll do all she can to get him out once he's been convicted. Later, Craig confronts her once more; he has questioned the bartender at the restaurant, where Stanley has left an indelible and negative impression; he knows Stanley left drunk at around 7.30 p.m., just before the time of the accident, and he also has her hand-written note telling him to meet her at the tavern at 7:00. Craig plans to take Stanley to the district attorney, but she escapes to her uncle's house and pleads for his help. Having just discovered he has only six months to live, Fitzroy is too distraught to do anything for her. The police arrive at Fitzroy's house; Stanley sees them and escapes through the back door and the garden. While pursued by the police, she crashes her car and dies.

Cast 

 Bette Davis as Stanley Timberlake Kingsmill
 Olivia de Havilland as Roy Timberlake Fleming
 George Brent as Craig Fleming
 Dennis Morgan as Peter Kingsmill
 Frank Craven as Asa Timberlake
 Billie Burke as Lavinia Timberlake
 Charles Coburn as William Fitzroy
 Ernest Anderson as Parry Clay
 Hattie McDaniel as Minerva Clay
 Lee Patrick as Betty Wilmoth
 Mary Servoss as Charlotte Fitzroy  
 William B. Davidson as Jim Purdy  
 Edward Fielding as Dr. Buchanan  
 John Hamilton as Inspector  
 William Forrest as Forest Ranger
 Walter Huston as Bartender (uncredited)

Production
The Ellen Glasgow novel, for which Warner Bros. paid $40,000 for the screen rights, portrayed William Fitzroy's incestuous desire for his niece Stanley as well as racist attitudes in Richmond society. Recommended by the director John Huston, the screenwriter Howard Koch believed he had to tone down these elements to satisfy the current Motion Picture Production Code. In his review of the completed film, the critic Bosley Crowther said it was "moderately faithful" to the novel and praised its portrayal of racial discrimination.

Bette Davis, eventually cast as Stanley Timberlake despite her desire to play the "good sister" Roy, was unhappy with the script. "The book by Miss Glasgow was brilliant," she later recalled. "I never felt the script lived up to the book." Nor did Glasgow. "She minced no words about the film," Davis said. "She was disgusted with the outcome. I couldn't have agreed with her more. A real story had been turned into a phony film."

Among the significant departures from the novel is the happy ending created for Roy and Craig Fleming.

Davis was also unhappy about events during production. While in the midst of costume and wig fittings, Davis was told her husband Arthur Farnsworth had been admitted to a Minneapolis hospital with severe pneumonia. Her friend Howard Hughes arranged a private plane, but her flight took two days because of being grounded by fog and storms. Almost immediately, studio head Jack L. Warner cabled her to demand her return to the film. Due to his pressure and her concern for her husband, Davis' own health declined.  Her doctor ordered her to return to Los Angeles by train to get some rest before returning to work.

Distressed to play Stanley rather than Roy – "I was not young enough for the part," Davis insisted  – the actress argued with producers about every aspect of her character. She directed her hair style and makeup. She insisted that Orry-Kelly redesign costumes for her, resulting in what others saw as an unflattering wardrobe. Davis aided the project by finding the right person to play Parry Clay. Huston had reviewed some African-American actors but was not satisfied with any. One day when Davis was in the studio commissary, she noticed Ernest Anderson working there as a waiter. She believed he had the right look and presence for the role and encouraged Huston to screen test Anderson. The director then cast the young man. Anderson won the 1942 National Board of Review Award for his performance.

Three days following the Japanese attack on Pearl Harbor, which pulled the U.S. into World War II, Huston had to leave the production for an assignment with the United States Department of War. The studio used Raoul Walsh to complete the film, although he received no screen credit. Walsh and Davis immediately clashed, and she refused to follow his direction or reshoot completed scenes. She developed laryngitis and stayed off the set for several days. After she returned, the producer Hal B. Wallis frequently acted as mediator between Davis and Walsh, who threatened to quit.

Because of the delays, the film was not done until mid-January 1942, well over schedule. The first preview was highly negative, with audience comments especially critical of Davis' hair, makeup, and wardrobe, the elements which she had controlled. Preparing for Now, Voyager, Davis disregarded the comments. She thought the film was "mediocre," although she was glad that the role of Parry Clay was "performed as an educated person. This caused a great deal of joy among Negroes. They were tired of the Stepin Fetchit vision of their people." When the U.S. wartime Office of Censorship reviewed the film in 1943 before foreign release, it disapproved the work because "It is made abundantly clear that a Negro's testimony in court is almost certain to be disregarded if in conflict with the testimony of a white person."

Critical reception
Bosley Crowther of the New York Times called it "neither a pleasant nor edifying film." He felt "the one exceptional component of the film" is the "brief but frank allusion to racial discrimination" which "is presented in a realistic manner, uncommon to Hollywood, by the definition of the Negro as an educated and comprehending character. Otherwise the story is pretty much of a downhill run." He added "Director John Huston, unfortunately, has not given this story sufficient distinction...The telling of it is commonplace, the movement uncomfortably stiff. Olivia de Havilland gives a warm and easy performance as the good sister who wins out in the end...But Miss Davis, by whom the whole thing pretty much stands or falls, is much too obviously mannered for this spectator's taste...It is likewise very hard to see her as the sort of sultry dame that good men can't resist. In short, her evil is so theatrical and so completely inexplicable that her eventual demise in an auto accident is the happiest moment in the film."

Variety noted "John Huston, in his second directorial assignment, provides deft delineations in the varied characters in the script. Davis is dramatically impressive in the lead but gets major assistance from Olivia de Havilland, George Brent, Dennis Morgan, Billie Burke and Hattie McDaniel. Script succeeds in presenting the inner thoughts of the scheming girl, and carries along with slick dialog and situations. Strength is added in several dramatic spots by Huston's direction."

Box office
According to Warner Bros records the film earned $1,651,000 domestically and $1,143,000 foreign.

Home media
On April 1, 2008, Warner Home Video released the film as part of the box set The Bette Davis Collection, Volume 3, which includes The Old Maid; All This, and Heaven Too; Watch on the Rhine; and Deception.

References

External links 
 
 
 
 
 

1942 films
1942 drama films
American black-and-white films
American drama films
1940s English-language films
Films about racism
Films based on American novels
Films directed by John Huston
Films scored by Max Steiner
Films set in Virginia
Films set in Baltimore
Films with screenplays by Howard Koch (screenwriter)
Warner Bros. films
1940s American films